The Coalition of Higher Education Students in Scotland (CHESS) was a body representative of students in Scotland, founded in 2001 by the Students' Associations of Aberdeen, Dundee, Edinburgh and St Andrews Universities, and Glasgow University's students' representative council.

CHESS is currently dormant, and has not published minutes since April 2009.

CHESS was founded in 1999 out of the previous Scottish Ancients Group when the Students' Association at Strathclyde demonstrated an interest in membership. Membership of CHESS was not incompatible with membership of the National Union of Students Scotland, though at the time the organisation went dormant all members except Aberdeen University Students' Association were non-affiliates of National Union of Students Scotland.

The goal of CHESS was to provide a national forum for dialogue and policy enhancement on issues affecting students. The body provided a channel for representing the views of students in Scotland to national and governmental bodies.

The CHESS Executive Committee was made up of two representatives from each member institution, usually the president and one other. There were two office bearers in CHESS; the convener, who chaired meetings and represented CHESS externally, and the secretary, who dealt with all administrative matters.

Members
Aberdeen University Students' Association
Dundee University Students' Association
Glasgow University Students' Representative Council
University of St Andrews Students' Association
Open University Students Association in Scotland
Glasgow School of Art Students' Association
National Postgraduate Committee (dormant since 2007)

Former members
Edinburgh University Students' Association (joined in 2002 as a founding member; disaffiliated on 10 January 2006)
University of Strathclyde Students' Association (disaffiliated in March 2010)

See also
National Union of Students Scotland

References

External links
 Coalition of Higher Education Students in Scotland (CHESS)

 

Groups of students' unions
Higher education in Scotland
2001 establishments in Scotland
Organizations established in 2001
Student organisations in the United Kingdom
Universities in Scotland